Club de Fútbol Nules is a Spanish football club based in Nules, Province of Castellón. It was founded on 19 October 1931 and currently plays in the Regional Preferente Valenciana, fifth tier on Spanish football.

Current squad

References

Club profile on La Preferente

Association football clubs established in 1931
Football clubs in the Valencian Community